Xuri Township is a township under the administration of Sêrtar County, Sichuan, China. , it has six villages under its administration.

References 

Township-level divisions of Sichuan
Sêrtar County